Domingo Ortiz de Rosas y García de Villasuso, 1st Marquis of Poblaciones (1683–1756) was a Spanish soldier who served as governor of Chile.

As Governor of Chile
Ortiz de Rosas was Governor from 1746 to 1755, during which time he moved the city of Concepción from its old location (today's city of Penco) to its current place. In addition, he founded a number of cities:
Casablanca (Santa Bárbara de Casablanca)
Coelemu (Villa Jesús de Coelemu)
La Ligua (Santo Domingo de Rosas de la Ligua)
Petorca (Santa Ana de Briviescas)
Quirihue (San Antonio Abad de Quirihue)

Other notable acts undertaken during his government were the creation, on March 11, 1747, of the first University in the colonial territory of Chile: the Royal University of San Felipe (Real Universidad de San Felipe), of which the first rector was Tomás de Azúa e Iturgoyen.  This university would eventually become today's Universidad de Chile.  He also established the penal colony on the Juan Fernández Islands.

Death
While on board the Spanish ship Leon, en route to Europe with his family, Ortiz de Rosas died on 29 June 1756.  The ship's log records his age as 80.  He was buried at sea
the following morning.

1683 births
1756 deaths
Royal Governors of Chile
Marquesses of Spain
Knights of Santiago
Spanish generals
18th-century Spanish nobility
Spanish colonial governors and administrators
Río de la Plata